Mazar-i-Sharif-Kabul-Peshawar railway line is a proposed rail project signed in February 2021 by Uzbekistan, Afghanistan and Pakistan. It will have an estimated length of 600 km of  track.

References

Proposed railway lines in Asia
International railway lines
Afghanistan–Pakistan relations
Afghanistan–Uzbekistan relations
Pakistan–Uzbekistan relations